Koklabari Chapaguri College is a self-financed institute affiliated to Bodoland University and permitted to Gauhati University It offers Bachelor of Arts.

Location of the College 
Koklabari Chapaguri College is located at Hazuwa under the revenue village ‘Hazuwa’. Further Hazuwa is bifurcated by a river called ‘Pota’ giving a lively view of the area. North of the ‘Pota’river is known as Hazuwa and southern part is Simla. The name Hazuwa has some background. The name appears itself because the people are very simple, honest, mild and innocent;as such the name of the place is Hazuwa (Hoza)since the British time. Hazuwa is under the revenue circle of Jalah and it has 78 villages. It is under the district Baksa in BTAD, Assam. The demography of the area is mostly of ST people and other backward classes. The general caste people are very thin. The livelihood of the locality is agriculture. Hardly few people are living on business and other different jobs. The educational background of this area is very backward because of the lack of academic atmosphere. Only few schools and one junior college is the only for the 10 + 2 education to the needy students. For higher education the aspirant students are to move to a long distance.	Considering all aspects of the area, the educated people of this area feel very hungrily to have Degree College to pursue higher education to the aspirant students. People gathered and decided to form a Trust to establish a new degree college at Hazuwa. The Trust was registered under society act. The Trust initiated their activities in step wise and finally the college was established at Hazuwa in 2013.

Academic 
 Bachelor of Arts
 B.A.in Bodo
 B.A in Assamese
 B.A in English
 B.A in Philosophy
 B.A in Economics
 B.A in Education
 B.A in Political science

References 

Colleges in India